XDS could refer to:

 Cross Enterprise Document Sharing, a system for sharing clinical documents between healthcare institutions
 Direct Save Protocol, a feature of the X Window System graphical user interface for Unix-like computer operating systems
 Envoy discovery services, see 
 Extended Data Services, a US standard for TV metadata transmission
 External Development Summit, an event for the video game industry
 Ottawa station, train station in Ottawa, Ontario, Canada with IATA code XDS used by Air France–KLM's connecting bus service
 Springfield Armory XD-S, a pistol sold in the United States designed for concealed carry
 X-ray diffuse scattering, a materials analysis technique
 X-Digital Systems satellite subcarrier audio format
 Xerox Data Systems, the name for Scientific Data Systems after it was purchased by Xerox Corporation